P0 or p0 may refer to:⁰
 P0 protein
lppp Standard atmospheric pressure of 101325 Pa
 Neutronium, hypothetically occupying Period 0 in the periodic table
 Proflight Zambia IATA airline coo

See also
 0P (disambiguation)
 PO (disambiguation)